Johann Theodor Scherk (8 July 1836 – 10 August 1923), generally referred to as J. T. Scherk or Theodor Scherk, was an Australian politician who represented the South Australian House of Assembly multi-member seats of East Adelaide from 1886 to 1902 and Adelaide from 1902 to 1905.  He was born in Kiel, Holstein, Denmark on 8 July 1836  and migrated to South Australia in 1861.

He served for a time as president of the Adelaide German Club.

References

External links
 Theodor Johannes Scherk, Australian Dictionary of Biography

1836 births
1923 deaths
Members of the South Australian House of Assembly
20th-century Australian politicians